Peck Up Your Troubles is a 1945 Warner Bros. Merrie Melodies animated short directed by Friz Freleng. The short was released on October 20, 1945, and stars Sylvester the Cat.

The cartoon marked the first appearance of Sylvester's long-time foe Hector the Bulldog, who would later become a recurring character in Tweety and Sylvester cartoons. The woodpecker would later reappear in A Peck o' Trouble, a Dodsworth Cat cartoon directed by Robert McKimson in 1953.

Plot
Sylvester is determined to get a male woodpecker that just moved in, high in a tree. He climbs, but the bird greases the tree; he starts to cut it down, but a mean dog (Hector, in his first appearance) stops him (this becomes a running gag). Several other attempts follow; at one point, he puts his paw into the bird's home, and the bird puts a tomato there.

Sylvester squishes it, and the bird dresses as an angel to torment him, but Sylvester sees through the disguise. Finally, Sylvester tries to blow up the tree; the dog again intervenes. Sylvester gets the dynamite off the tree and puts out the fuses, but the bird has lit them again, and now Sylvester dies and really becomes an angel.

See also
 List of films about angels

References

External links
 

1945 films
1945 short films
1945 animated films
1940s Warner Bros. animated short films
American animated short films
Merrie Melodies short films
Sylvester the Cat films
Woodpeckers
Animated films about birds
Animated films about dogs
Animated films set in the United States
Films set in 1945
Animated films without speech
Short films directed by Friz Freleng
Films with screenplays by Michael Maltese
Films scored by Carl Stalling
Warner Bros. Cartoons animated short films
Animated films about cats
Films about angels